Serafina Cuomo (born May 21, 1966) is an Italian historian and professor at Durham University. Cuomo specialises in the history of ancient mathematics, including the computing practices in ancient Rome and Pappos, and also with the history of technology.

Education 
Cuomo achieved a bachelor's degree in Philosophy at the University of Naples and received a doctorate in History and Philosophy from the University of Cambridge.

Career 
Cuomo formerly worked as a speaker at Imperial College London, Birkbeck University of London. Currently, Cuomo works at Durham University at the Department of Classics and Ancient History.

In 2019, Cuomo participated in the EHESS (École des Hautes Etudes en Sciences Sociales).

Books 
 Pappus of Alexandria and the Mathematics of Late Antiquity (Cambridge Classical Studies, Cambridge University Press, 2000)
 Ancient Mathematics (Sciences of Antiquity, Routledge, 2001)
 Technology and Culture in Greek and Roman Antiquity (Key Themes in Ancient History, Cambridge University Press, 2007)

Articles and chapters 
“Skills and virtues in Vitruvius’ book 10”, in M. Formisano (ed.), War in Words, Leiden: Brill 2011, 309-32
“All the proconsul’s men: Cicero, Verres and account-keeping”, Annali dell’Università degli studi di Napoli ‘L’ Orientale’. Sezione filologico-letteraria. Quaderni 15, Naples 2011, 165-85
“A Roman engineer’s tales”, Journal of Roman Studies 101 (2011), 143-65
“Measures for an emperor: Volusius Maecianus’ monetary pamphlet for Marcus Aurelius”, in J. König & T. Whitmarsh (eds.), Ordering Knowledge in the Roman Empire, Cambridge University Press 2007, 206-228
“The machine and the city: Hero of Alexandria's Belopoeica”, in C.J. Tuplin & T.E. Rihll (eds.), Science and Mathematics in Ancient Greek Culture, Oxford: Oxford University Press 2002, 165-77
“Divide and rule: Frontinus and Roman land-surveying”, Studies in History and Philosophy of Science 31 (2000), 189-202
“Shooting by the book: Notes on Tartaglia's ‘Scientia Nova’”, History of Science 35 (1997), 155-88

References 

1966 births
Living people
Classical scholars of the University of Durham
Alumni of the University of Cambridge
21st-century Italian historians
University of Naples Federico II alumni